Riley Everhart Farm and General Store is a historic farm and general store located near Welcome, Davidson County, North Carolina. The main house was built in 1885, and is an I-house that consists of a two-story, three bay by two-bay, brick main block with a two-story rear ell with Italianate style design elements.  It has a one-story front porch and one-story porches on the ell. The Arnold General Store and Post Office is a tall, narrow two-story, three bay, frame building with a gable roof. Also on the property are the contributing original brick dairy and wellhouse, original log barn, granary, gear house, corn crib, woodhouse, chicken house, and garage.

It was added to the National Register of Historic Places in 1984.

References

Farms on the National Register of Historic Places in North Carolina
Commercial buildings on the National Register of Historic Places in North Carolina
Italianate architecture in North Carolina
Houses completed in 1885
Buildings and structures in Davidson County, North Carolina
National Register of Historic Places in Davidson County, North Carolina
Houses in Davidson County, North Carolina